This list of theatre acting awards is an index to articles about awards for acting in live theatre. Some awards are given for acting in different types of theatre performance, including drama, comedy, musicals, opera etc. Others are limited to musicals or to plays.

General

Musicals

Plays

See also

 Lists of awards
 Lists of acting awards
 List of theatre awards

References

 
theatre